Steven Curtis Henderson (born November 18, 1952) is a former Major League Baseball left fielder who is best remembered for being one of the players the New York Mets acquired in the infamous "Midnight Massacre."

Cincinnati Reds
Henderson was drafted by the Cincinnati Reds in the fifth round of the 1974 Major League Baseball Draft out of Prairie View A&M University.

New York Mets
Tom Seaver was in a contract dispute with New York Mets chairman M. Donald Grant when on June 15, 1977, the Mets traded Seaver to the Cincinnati Reds for Pat Zachry, Doug Flynn, Dan Norman and Henderson, one of a series of trades that became known as the "Midnight Massacre".

Henderson debuted with the Mets the following day as a pinch runner for Ed Kranepool, and his first major league run was the tying run in the Mets' 4-3 victory over the Houston Astros. On June 21, facing the Atlanta Braves at Shea Stadium, Kranepool hit a ninth inning home run off Andy Messersmith to send the game into extra innings. Following a one-out double by John Stearns in the 11th inning, the Braves intentionally walked Félix Millán to get to Henderson. The strategy didn't work, as Henderson connected for a three-run walk off home run.

He set a Mets rookie record, tied by Josh Satin in 2013, by reaching base in 29 consecutive games that he started.

For the season, Henderson had a .297 batting average in 99 games and 350 at-bats with twelve home runs, 65 runs batted in, 67 runs, 104 hits, sixteen doubles, six triples, six stolen bases, 43 base on balls, and four sacrifice flies. He finished second to Andre Dawson of the Montreal Expos in National League Rookie of the Year balloting by only one point (10–9).

On June 14, 1980, Henderson had perhaps his best moment in a major league uniform. The Mets had recovered from a terrible start to the season, going on a tear to approach the .500 mark.  That day, facing the Giants, Mets' starting pitcher Pete Falcone was lit up, staking the Giants to a 5-0 lead, which later became 6-0.  Still trailing 6-2 with two outs in the ninth, the Mets staged a highly improbable comeback, which ended with Henderson hitting a three-run home run to win the game 7-6 in the bottom of the ninth, pulling the team within a game of .500.  Alas, the Mets resumed their losing ways immediately thereafter, as that day turned out to be the high point of the season.

According to Henderson, he was at his best when he focused on getting hits, and suffered when he was pressured by the Mets to try to hit home runs. Henderson was not a natural power hitter, but the Mets were desperate for power at the time.

On February 28, eager to make right with a fan base that had become disenchanted with the team, the Mets sent Henderson and cash to the Chicago Cubs in order to reacquire Dave Kingman, who had been traded away during the "Midnight Massacre". For his Mets career, Henderson batted .287 with 35 home runs and 227 RBI.

Chicago Cubs
Henderson batted .293 with five home runs and 32 RBIs during the  strike shortened season. His production fell off considerably the following season, as he batted only .233, and found himself sharing playing time in left field with Keith Moreland and Jay Johnstone. Following the season, he was traded to the Seattle Mariners for Rich Bordi.

Oakland A's
After two seasons in Seattle, Henderson and Kingman became teammates when Henderson signed as a free agent with the Oakland Athletics on March 31, 1985. Batting only .077 for the season, he was released by the A's on May 29, 1986.

He signed with the Chicago White Sox shortly afterwards, and spent the remainder of the season with their triple-A affiliate, the Buffalo Bisons, where he batted .288 with five home runs. The ChiSox released him at the end of the season. Henderson then signed again with the A's for 1987, and split the season between Oakland and their Triple-A affiliate, the Tacoma Tigers.

Houston Astros
After splitting the season between the Astros and their Triple-A affiliate, the Tucson Toros, Henderson was released during the off season. He played the entire  season with the Buffalo Bisons, who were now a Pittsburgh Pirates affiliate, before retiring.

Henderson finished in the top ten in the National League in OBP twice during his career.

Post playing career
Following his retirement, he won the Senior Professional Baseball Association championship with the St. Petersburg Pelicans.

Henderson served as a coach in the Pittsburgh Pirates minor league system from  through .

He was relieved of his duties as hitting coach of the Tampa Bay Rays on October 5, 2009. Henderson joined the Philadelphia Phillies in 2010 as an outfield/baserunning coordinator, and he spent 2011 and 2012 as the organization's hitting coordinator. On October 4, 2012, he was promoted to hitting coach for the major league team. He was fired by the Phillies after the 2016 season.

He and his wife, Pam, reside in Tampa, Florida.

References

External links

Steve Henderson at Baseball Gauge
Steve Henderson at Pura Pelota (Venezuelan Professional Baseball League)

1952 births
Living people
African-American baseball coaches
African-American baseball players
Baseball players from Houston
Billings Mustangs players
Buffalo Bisons (minor league) players
Chicago Cubs players
Houston Astros coaches
Houston Astros players
Indianapolis Indians players
Leones del Caracas players
American expatriate baseball players in Venezuela
Major League Baseball hitting coaches
Major League Baseball left fielders
New York Mets players
Oakland Athletics players
Philadelphia Phillies coaches
Prairie View A&M Panthers baseball players
Prairie View A&M University alumni
Seattle Mariners players
St. Petersburg Pelicans players
Tacoma Tigers players
Tampa Bay Devil Rays coaches
Tampa Bay Rays coaches
Tampa Tarpons (1957–1987) players
Trois-Rivières Aigles players
Tucson Toros players
21st-century African-American people
20th-century African-American sportspeople